Rodrigo Lima may refer to:
 Rodrigo Lima (fighter)
 Rodrigo Lima (footballer)